Ardakan; the word Ardakan is derived from the word Artaken or Artakan means a place of brave men (Arta: brave man, Kan/Gan: place). It is one of the ancient cities in Iran. Ardakan is between way of yasuj-shiraz. It's the capital of Sepidan County in Fars Province

At the 2006 census, its population was 16,212, in 3,534 families.

History
Some people say this city was one of the military places in the Achaemenid and Sassanid rules because it's near of Persepolis and because it has a nice weather

References

External links

Populated places in Sepidan County
Cities in Fars Province